Catarina is a municipality in the San Marcos department of Guatemala. It is recognised as different municipality on 20 January 1925, when it split from Malacatán municipality.

Climate

Catarina has tropical monsoon climate (Köppen: Am).

Geographic location

Catarina is surrounded by San Marcos Department municipalities.

See also

References

External links
Some information 

Municipalities of the San Marcos Department